Holdgate (or Stanton Holdgate or Castle Holdgate) is a small village in Shropshire, England. It forms part of the civil parish of Abdon and Heath. Its name is taken from its Norman lord Helgot  who owned the village in 1086 along with 17 other parishes in Shropshire.

Its parish church is Holy Trinity. There are remnants of the medieval Holdgate Castle. Holdgate was once (in medieval times) a more populous place than today.

Holdgate was a civil parish until 1967. Bouldon was, until 1884, a detached part of Holdgate parish.

A mile (1.6 km) to the northeast is the village of Stanton Long. Between the two villages, but within the former Holdgate parish (now in the Abdon and Heath parish) is the hamlet of Brookhampton.

To the south is Tugford.

See also
Holdgate Fee
Deserted medieval village
Listed buildings in Abdon, Shropshire

References

External links

British History Online Holdgate

Villages in Shropshire
Former civil parishes in Shropshire